Yongning Township is a township under the administration of Luxi County, Yunnan, China. , it has six villages under its administration.

References 

Township-level divisions of Honghe Hani and Yi Autonomous Prefecture
Luxi County, Yunnan